The 26th Dalmatia Division (Serbo-Croatian Latin: Dvadesetšesta dalmatinska divizija) was a Yugoslav Partisan division formed on 8 October 1943. It was formed from the 11th, 12th and 13th Dalmatia Brigades. In January 1944, the 13th Dalmatia Brigade left the division while the 1st Dalmatia Brigade joined it. The 3rd Overseas Brigade joined the division in March 1944. The division mostly operated in the Southern Dalmatia where it fought against parts of the 2nd Panzer Army, 118th Jäger Division, 7th SS Division, and 369th Infantry Division.

References 

Divisions of the Yugoslav Partisans
Military units and formations established in 1943